Valcareggi is an Italian surname. Notable people with the surname include:

Ferruccio Valcareggi (1919–2005), Italian footballer and manager
Massimiliano Valcareggi (born 1995), Italian alpine skier

Italian-language surnames